I Robot is the second studio album by British rock band The Alan Parsons Project, released on 8 July 1977 by Arista Records. The album draws conceptually on author Isaac Asimov's science fiction Robot stories, exploring philosophical themes regarding artificial intelligence. It was re-released on vinyl and cassette tape in 1984 and on CD in 2007.

Background and concept 
The album was intended to be based on the I, Robot stories written by Asimov, and Eric Woolfson spoke with Asimov himself, who was enthusiastic about the idea. As the rights already had been granted to a TV/movie company, the album's title was altered slightly by removing the comma in "I,", and the theme and lyrics were made to be more generically about robots rather than to be specific to the Asimov universe. The cover inlay reads: "I Robot... The story of the rise of the machine and the decline of man, which paradoxically coincided with his discovery of the wheel... and a warning that his brief dominance of this planet will probably end, because man tried to create robot in his own image." The title of the final track, "Genesis Ch.1 v.32", follows this theme by implying a continuation to the story of Creation, since the first chapter of Genesis only has 31 verses.

Artwork
The artwork was created by the English art design group Hipgnosis. The album cover photo features Storm Thorgerson's assistants in the escalator tubes of the circular Terminal 1 building of the Charles de Gaulle Airport outside of Paris. The picture was taken without the permission of the airport management. Over this is superimposed a painting of a robot with a stylised atom for a brain. The robot also appears on the label of the record. The original vinyl release has a gatefold-style cover; the inside spread has the lyrics and a monochrome photograph of Parsons. The pose and angle of the photograph echoes that of the robot on the front cover.

Singles
Three singles were released from the album: "I Wouldn't Want to Be Like You", "Don't Let it Show" and "Day After Day (The Show Must Go On)". The LP track "Breakdown" went into heavy rotation on AOR stations and continues to be played on classic rock radio.

Reissues
I Robot has been reissued multiple times in various formats since its initial release on vinyl, including numerous audiophile releases. Besides the 8-track, vinyl and compact-cassette releases, Arista also released the original aluminum CD along with the rest of the Project albums, up to that time. Mobile Fidelity Sound Lab (MFSL) released the album on standard vinyl (MFSL 1-084), UHQR vinyl (MFQR 1-084), Ultradisk One-Step vinyl (UD1S 1-041), and on aluminium CD (MFCD-1-804). Classic Records has released the album in analogue form on 180-gram vinyl, as well as digitally on HDAD (24 bit/192 kHz DVD-Audio and 24 bit/96 kHz DVD-Video). JVC released the album as a K2 edition, with Ammonia Avenue and Eye in the Sky. In 2007, as part of a larger campaign, Sony released a remastered version along with bonus tracks on CD. It was later released in Japan as an SHM-CD, with the same mastering.

The album was re-released under Legacy Recordings as a "legacy edition" in 2013 on CD, with an extra disc with unreleased bonus tracks, mastered by Dave Donelly. There was also a vinyl edition with the same mastering launched one month later.

Track listing
All songs written and composed by Alan Parsons and Eric Woolfson, except where noted.

2007 reissue bonus tracks
"Boules" (I Robot experiment) – 1:59
"Breakdown" (early demo of backing riff) – 2:09
"I Wouldn't Want to Be Like You" (backing track rough mix) – 3:28
"Day After Day" (early stage rough mix) – 3:40
"The Naked Robot" – 10:19

2013 Sony Music Entertainment reissue (Legacy Edition) bonus tracks
"U.S Radio Commercial for I Robot – 1:01
"I Robot (Boules Experiment)" – 1:59
"I Robot" (Hilary Western Vocal Rehearsal) – 1:33
"Extract 1 from The Alan Parsons Project Audio Guide" – 1:04
"Extract 2 from The Alan Parsons Project Audio Guide" – 0:57
"I Wouldn't Want to Be Like You" (backing track rough mix) – 3:28
"Some Other Time" (Complete vocal by Jaki Whitren) – 3:43
"Breakdown" (early demo of backing riff) – 2:09
"Extract 3 from The Alan Parsons Project Audio Guide" – 0:31
"Breakdown - The Choir" – 1:51
"Don't let it Show" (Eric Woolfson demo) – 3:26
"Day After Day" (early stage rough mix) – 3:40
 "Genesis Ch. 1 V. 32" (Choir session) – 2:18
"The Naked Robot" – 10:19

Personnel
David Paton – bass, acoustic guitar, backing vocals
Stuart Tosh – drums, percussion, backing vocals
Ian Bairnson – electric and acoustic guitars, backing vocals
Eric Woolfson – keyboards, vocoder, backing vocals
Alan Parsons – keyboards, vocoder, backing vocals, acoustic guitar
Duncan Mackay – keyboards
B.J. Cole – steel guitar
John Leach – cimbalom, kantele
Lenny Zakatek, Allan Clarke, Steve Harley, Jack Harris, Peter Straker, Jaki Whitren, Dave Townsend, the English Chorale, the New Philharmonia Chorus – vocals
Hilary Western – backing vocals
Smokey Parsons – backing vocals
Tony Rivers, John Perry and Stu Calver – backing vocals on "Some Other Time"
Produced and engineered by Alan Parsons, executive producer Eric Woolfson
Orchestra and choir arranged and conducted by Andrew Powell

Charts

Weekly charts

Year-end charts

Certifications and sales

In popular culture

 "Don't Let It Show" was covered by Pat Benatar for her In the Heat of the Night LP. Gail Godwin describes it as "much more sentimental than the usual Alan Parsons".  A remixed version of the original "Don't Let It Show" was also used as the theme for an unsold pilot of the game show 21 (hosted by Jim Lange and announced by Charlie O'Donnell) in 1982.
 "Some Other Time" was also covered by Arjen Anthony Lucassen in his 2012 album Lost in the New Real.
 "I Wouldn't Want to Be Like You" is featured in the 2013 video game Grand Theft Auto V on the fictional radio station "Los Santos Rock Radio". The song was also featured in Season 1, episode 9, of the Netflix series Mindhunter, it was played as an ending song for the episode, the song was extended so it could cover the whole credits roll.
 "Genesis Ch. 1 V. 32" was featured in Season 1, episode 6 ("Toys"), of the Amazon Prime Video series Homecoming.

References

The Alan Parsons Project albums
1977 albums
Albums with cover art by Hipgnosis
Science fiction concept albums
Albums produced by Alan Parsons
Arista Records albums